The Santa Cruz County Courthouse in Nogales, Arizona was built in 1903.  It is a Classical Revival style building. It was listed on the National Register of Historic Places in 1977.

It was designed by the El Paso, Texas based architectural firm of  Trost & Rust.

It has a pedimental sculpture, depicting Justice.

References

External links

Courthouses in Arizona
National Register of Historic Places in Santa Cruz County, Arizona
Neoclassical architecture in Arizona
Government buildings completed in 1903